Medivac, an Australian television drama series, ran on Network Ten from 1996 to 1998. There were 48 episodes produced. Medivac is an abbreviation of the term medical evacuation. The series was also known as Adrenaline Junkies overseas. It is a cult program amongst King Island's LGBTIQ+ community. 

Medivac was set in the emergency department of Brisbane's fictional Bethlehem West Hospital, where a dedicated medical team works in the demanding world of emergency medicine. The team specialises in the evacuation of disaster areas, journeying by helicopter to remote areas inaccessible by ambulance. They also work in the city streets and the suburbs involving themselves with the patients, their families and the police.

Cast
 Nicholas Eadie as Dr. Red Buchanan
 Genevieve Picot as Dr. Julia McAlpine
 Graeme Blundell as Dr. Harry Edwards
 Grant Bowler as Dr. Arch Craven
 Rena Owen as Macy Fields, RN
 Caroline Kennison as Gosia Maléski, RN
 Eugene Gilfedder as Dr. Wayne Doubé
 Danielle Carter as Bree Dalrymple, RN
 Mark Constable as Dr. "Oopy" Hiltonwood
 Lisa Forrest as Dr. Marina Zamoyski
 Stephen Lovatt as Dr. Tom Shawcross
 Dieter Brummer as Dr. Sean Michaels
 Simone Kessell as Dr. Stella O'Shaughnessy
 Melissa Tkautz as Evie Morrison RN

Locations
The former Australian Taxation Office building, at the corner of Wharf and Adelaide Streets in Brisbane, was used as the location of the hospital.

Also used old Brisbane domestic airport terminal area where the car auctions are for a scene set in western QLD.
Tarmac covered in dirt for it.

See also

 List of Australian television series

References

External links
 
 Australian Television Information Archive
|%20Number%3A664824%20|%20Number%3A664825;querytype=;resCount=10 Medivac at the National Film and Sound Archive

Australian drama television series
Network 10 original programming
Australian medical television series
Television shows set in Queensland
1996 Australian television series debuts
1998 Australian television series endings
Television series by Beyond Television Productions